Ivan Frederiksen is a Danish curler and curling coach.

Teams

Record as a coach of national teams

Personal life
His son Johnny Frederiksen is well-known Danish curler too.

References

External links
 

Living people
Danish male curlers
Danish curling champions
Danish curling coaches
Year of birth missing (living people)